Alpha Leporis (α Leporis, abbreviated Alpha Lep, α Lep), formally named Arneb , is the brightest star in the constellation of Lepus.

Nomenclature 
Alpha Leporis is the star's Bayer designation. The traditional name Arneb comes from the Arabic أرنب  ’arnab 'hare' ('Lepus' is Latin for hare). In 2016, the International Astronomical Union organized a Working Group on Star Names (WGSN) to catalog and standardize proper names for stars. The WGSN's first bulletin of July 2016 included a table of the first two batches of names approved by the WGSN; which included Arneb for this star.

Properties 
This is a massive star with about 14 times the mass of the Sun. Alpha Leporis has a stellar classification of F0 Ib, with the Ib luminosity class indicating that it is a lower luminosity supergiant star. Since 1943, the spectrum of this star has served as one of the stable anchor points by which other stars are classified. The effective temperature of the outer envelope is about 6,850 K, which gives the star a yellow-white hue that is typical of F-type stars. It is an estimated 13 million years old.

Alpha Leporis is an older, dying star that may have already passed through a supergiant phase and is now contracting and heating up in the latter phases of stellar evolution, or perhaps is still expanding into the supergiant phase. Based upon its estimated mass, it is expected to end its life in a spectacular stellar explosion known as a supernova. However, this is not expected to happen for another million years.

Arneb in Military
USS Arneb (AKA-56) was a ship of the  United States navy.

References

Leporis, Alpha
Lepus (constellation)
F-type supergiants
Arneb
Leporis, 11
025985
1865
036673
Durchmusterung objects
Triple star systems
Suspected variables